is a Japanese manga series written and illustrated by Yoshitoki Ōima. It has been serialized in Weekly Shōnen Magazine since November 2016, with individual chapters collected by Kodansha into nineteen tankōbon volumes as of February 2023. The story is about an immortal being, Fushi, who takes on multiple forms and freely utilizes their respective natural abilities at will, including that of an abandoned white-haired boy and his white wolf, in order to further evolve and stimulate as it learns what it is to be truly human over the decades and centuries.

Ōima, inspired by her own grandmother's death, aimed to write about survival and the character Fushi, who initially is an emotionless stone but gradually develops a self and personality as a result of interacting with humans, young and old alike. In contrast to her previous work, A Silent Voice, To Your Eternity puts little focus on the cast's past but instead, upon the future.

To Your Eternity has been well received in Japan, earning many awards and major sales. Critical response to the series debut was positive, based on the emotional focus on the villagers and Fushi to the point of often earning perfect scores. Despite some skeptical commentary on subsequent chapters lacking the same impact, Fushi's continuous character arc was praised while Ōima's artistry enjoyed positive reviews due to its detailed facial expressions and environments. In North America, the manga is licensed by Kodansha USA for a digital and printed English release. An anime television series adaptation of the manga, produced by Brain's Base, aired from April to August 2021 on Japan's NHK Educational TV; a second season produced by Drive aired from October 2022 to March 2023. A third season has been announced.

Plot

Season One
An otherworldly being called the Beholder creates a white orb (later named Fushi by a rambunctious young girl). Fushi takes on the form of a rock, then a dying arctic wolf. Fushi meets a white-haired boy living alone who mistakes him for his pet wolf, Joaan. After the boy dies, Fushi takes his form. He travels to the land of Ninannah, and meets a young girl called March, who was chosen as a sacrifice to a large white bear named Oniguma. March names Fushi and teaches him the rudiments of speech, and how to use his hands. Fushi defeats Oniguma, and he, March, Parona (an older sister figure to March), and the elderly woman Pioran, are taken prisoner by Hayase, to Yanome. They escape, but young March is killed protecting Parona and becomes a spirit. Fushi part ways with Parona and leaves Ninannah to escape Hayase, who is determined to control Fushi.

Accompanying Pioran, Fushi begins to speak like a child. As they travel to Takunaha, they are attacked by a plant-like being that can steal Fushi's forms and memories, a Nokker. Fushi kills it, regaining his memories. In Takunaha, Fushi meets a boy named Gugu, who was disfigured in an accident after saving Rean. Gugu saves Fushi from another Nokker, and Fushi, Gugu and Rean become friends. For four years, Fushi refrains from transforming or creating objects in order to live as a human. A Nokker attacks and Gugu was killed in the process while sacrificing himself to save Rean, who becomes a spirit like March. Fushi leaves Takunaha, paranoid of Nokker attacks, followed by Pioran.

Hayase pays a girl named Tonari to lure Fushi and Pioran onto a prison ship to Jananda island. Fushi enters the island's gladiatorial tournament. In the final round, Fushi faces Hayase, who reveals she killed Parona, assuming her form. An enraged Fushi is defeated by Hayase, who captures and attempts to rape him. Tonari and her friends come to try and save him, but at the same time, Nokkers attack the island, and three of Tonari's friends are killed. Fushi kills the Nokkers, and leaves the island with Hayase, abandoning her to die in the ocean, where she is attacked by a Nokker. Fushi reunites with Pioran and travels to an uninhabited island, but she develops dementia. Before her death, she asks the Beholder to have herself reborn as something useful to Fushi, a horse that Fushi later acquires.

Season Two
Fushi remains on the island for forty years, until Nokkers begin attacking humans off the island. As he prepares to leave, he meets Hisame, the nine-year-old granddaughter and reincarnation of Hayase. Hisame's left arm contains the Nokker which had merged with Hayase. The two travel to the site of the Nokker attack, where they meet the grown Tonari and Sander. Hisame tries to kill Tonari, and is wounded herself, but escapes. Tonari dies in front of Fushi, and becomes a spirit. Fushi rescues Hisame and refrains from killing the Nokker in her arm after she agrees to leave him. For the next two centuries, Fushi avoids extensive human contact, and is regularly visited by the obsessed Hayase's reincarnations and descendants; one of which is a male named Kahaku. They establish a religious cult called the Guardian Force, worshiping Fushi and opposing the Nokkers. After rival religions begin denouncing Fushi, Kahaku removes Fushi from his solitude to further improve his image.

The two are captured by Prince Bonichen, who had been instructed by Tonari to find Fushi. Bon lends his princely approval to Fushi and the Guardians, becoming a target for those opposed to Fushi. Bon witnesses Fushi resurrect a dead princess, but hides the fact from Fushi. Fushi is arrested by another kingdom and forced to demonstrate resurrection, but fails. Both Bon and Fushi are imprisoned, with Fushi encased in solid iron. Fushi escapes and rescues Bon, faking his death. The Nokker in Kahaku's arm warns that the Nokkers will attack the large city Renril in one year. Bon and Kahaku gather allies and warn the city, while Fushi further develops his ability to create objects from nothing.

In disguise as Booze Man, Fushi destroys and recreates buildings in Renril as extensions of his body. Hundreds of Nokkers attack the city, and during the battle March is accidentally resurrected. Tee of Bon's allies are killed, and Bon tells Fushi they can return to life. Fushi uses them to defend the city, resurrecting them where needed. As the battle continues, Kahaku's Nokker attacks Fushi, returning him to his original orb form. Bon kills himself near Fushi, giving him his form. Able to see the spirits of his friends, Fushi remembers them and returns them to life, and the battle is won as Fushi regains strength. Kahaku leaves the city with his Nokker, and later kills himself and his Nokker, but not before expressing his strong love for Fushi.

Fushi tells his friends he will make the world peaceful, and resurrect them after he has done so. He sleeps and spreads his body across the planet, to stop the Nokkers from returning. Fushi's friends live their lives and all die as Fushi sleeps. After 600 years, Fushi's body encompasses the entire planet, now at a modern level of technological advancement. During his sleep, the Nokkers become microscopically small, secretly living inside of and controlling human beings. Kahaku's Nokker lives in the brain of Mizuha, the eighteenth reincarnation of Hayase, and this Nokker leads the others in preparation for Fushi's return.

Season Three
After awakening, Fushi resurrects the eleven spirits following him, including his closest friends March, Gugu, Tonari Dalton and Bonichen. The Beholder transforms himself into a twelve-year-old boy, calling himself Satoru. Fushi meets a boy named Yuki, and Mizuha, who falls in love with Fushi. Mizuha murders her mother, but she returns to life without Fushi's involvement, alerting him to the Nokkers' return. As he learns that the Nokkers are now living peacefully among humanity, Fushi becomes confused about what to do. He attempts to fight the Nokkers on his own, but Kahaku's Nokker launches an attack on Yuki's school. Kahaku's Nokker is killed, and its organization collapses, but Nokkers continue living among humans. Satoru offers Fushi omnipotence, but he refuses. Before losing his memories Satoru reveals that he created the world out of boredom, then wanted to die in his creation, leaving Fushi to watch over it. After six decades, knowledge of Nokkers has become commonplace, Yuki dies, and Fushi leaves Yuki's home with his resurrected friends.

Characters

A divine creature who can change his form and grow objects from his body. He was sent to Earth to preserve information and experiences. Through his journey he learns how to communicate with humans.

Shapeshifting and parasitic entities that attempt to thwart the Beholder and Fushi's purpose in preserving all that exists. They are recurring antagonists throughout the series, one of which actually merges with the human Hayase, and continues to have some power over her many reincarnations/descendants over the centuries. 
The White-Haired Boy
A young and lonely unnamed boy and the very first human being Fushi meets in the form of his good longtime wolf friend Joaan. After he dies, Fushi takes his form, often using it as a default appearance.

A young girl who adopts Fushi after escaping from a sacrifice ritual.

An exiled villager; a friend and older sister figure to March.

An elderly woman who takes care of Fushi. She ultimately dies of old age and is reborn as a horse who aids Fushi over the decades as per her dying request. 

 (Japanese); Kira Buckland (English)
A warrior who tries to sacrifice young March and later killed her. She takes an obsessive interest in Fushi and his ever-developing otherworldly abilities. She served as a primary antagonist for the first few arcs of the manga, and first season of the anime. Her descendants and reincarnations then entirely devote themselves to protecting Fushi in her stead and intend to carry on her twisted bloodline for future generations as devoted cult-like unit called the Guardians. 

A young man who works in Booze Man's restaurant after being treated by the latter when he was nearly dying and thus covers his damaged face with a mask.

Gugu's older brother who abandoned him.

A wealthy young girl who frequents Booze's store as she befriends Gugu and Fushi.

The owner of a distillery and friend of Pioran.

A young girl who accompanied her father when he was exiled to Janada, an island for criminals.

Hayase's granddaughter and the leader of a group called Guardians, who seek to protect Fushi.

A distant male descendant of Hayase and current leader of the Guardians.

An extremely eccentric prince of the Uralis Kingdom, who seeks to capture and get close to Fushi.

Bonchien's little brother.

Bonchien's little sister.

One of Bonchien's ghost confidantes.

One of Bonchien's ghost confidantes.

Bon's love interest.

The head of the Church of Bennett, a religious organization opposing Fushi, believing him to actually cause the conflict with Nokkers.

An experienced soldier in the Uralis army.

A skilled soldier and a member of the Church of Bennett.

A mysanthrope soldier, who is secretly a prince of Renril.

The princess of Renril and acting queen, Messar's half-sister.

A mute little girl from a distant village, where people use vases to communicate, who Fushi takes in.

A chubby and cheerful soldier of Renril, who is attracted to Yuiss.

A stoick archer in Renril's army.

The narrator and Fushi's creator who threw Fushi, as the Orb, to Earth in the series' beginning to observe it as it further changes form and acquires more and stimulation. He ultimately makes the choice to abandon his creation and have his own fey/vital spiritual essence reborn as a young human boy named Satoru.

Production
Manga artist Yoshitoki Ōima conceived the title To Your Eternity after learning that her sick grandmother was going to pass away. At the outset, she was only certain of the title's nuance, but could not arrive at a decision. With the encouragement of colleagues, she eventually chose To Your Eternity. The decision to give the manga a fantasy setting was taken for the freedom it afforded, with supernatural beings offering unusual possibilities. She compares To Your Eternity to her other works, and states that, while A Silent Voice focuses on characters in the present confronting their past, To Your Eternity focuses on the future. She also mentions exploring the theme of death in Mardock Scramble, A Silent Voice and To Your Eternity. The character Fushi originated from Ōima's work in primary school, although the setting changed before the series started. Fushi was originally to be female, but a colleague suggested a male protagonist for a different appeal. Ōima wanted to make the protagonist neutral, and said she prefers neutral female characters. Each volume cover represents a character's dream such as the first one, which depicts the unnamed youth finding freedom. According to Oima, Fushi does not want to forget the people he meets on his journeys.

Characters featured in the series are based on real life personalities. For example, Pioran reminded Ōima of her deceased grandmother. She furthermore expresses some guilt for having characters die. There are approximately 13 characters that are greatly affected by Fushi and which, before the series' beginning, would lead Ōima to the title, before being replaced by "To Your Eternity". When it came to drawing, March was Ōima's favorite character due to her short stature. Furthermore, Ōima says she likes drawing children in confined places.

The overall setting is that of a main character being "a boy who knows nothing". Ōima wanted the reader to find themself, like Fushi, in this situation where they do not know anything. It is for this reason that she did not give prominence to any character other than the hero. A common theme portrayed in the manga is death and immortality. To reinforce the blank slate themes, she decided to create a white universe, which was how she obtained a snowy landscape. As characters living in this snowy region are not part of an indigenous population, she decided not to depict them as, for example, Inuit. For research, she watched several documentaries in order to learn how to make the boy look like he was living in a world of "survival", with limited resources and skills. To accomplish this, she had to think deeply about what was practical under such difficult circumstances. March was created to be talkative and balance the quiet ones. The manga presents the climate, disease and the polar bear as obstacles to the human will. Ōima elaborates that people have to live with these challenges, and it is to show how to overcome them that she included them in the scenes.

Adaptation
Director  expressed surprise when first reading the manga series, initially believing the young villager would be the lead character rather than Fushi. He felt that the themes Ōima was approaching were thought-provoking, which he found challenging. Murata stated that, as minor parts of the manga were changed, the anime would stay true to the original printed version. The official Twitter account of the anime series stated that the main theme presented through March (and later Fushi) was the notion of growing into adulthood.

In casting the actors, Reiji Kawashima's voice quality was befitting for Fushifrom his point of view. "The Observer", played by Kenjiro Tsuda, is a narrative role that was not all that involved in the story due to Murata's view that Tsuda's voice was "cool". The first episode only had two voice actors: Kawashima and Tsuda. The former expressed relief when working as he felt that Tsuda was a friendly person. Tsuda felt that Kawashima was a passionate actor, exemplified by his early arrival for each episode's recording session. Kawashima thought his character to be exhausting based on his varied experiences, while Tsuda felt Fushi was too mysterious. Rie Hikisaka, who plays March, enjoyed Kawashima's work and his interactions with Pioran. For the sixth episode, Kawashima expressed difficulty portraying Fushi's lines due to the fact that the character was learning how to speak. Ryoko Shiraishi commented that while she enjoyed voicing Gugu, the character's fluid personality made the work more challenging.

Media

Manga

Yoshitoki Ōima debuted To Your Eternity in issue 50 of Kodansha's Weekly Shōnen Magazine on November 9, 2016. It was Ōima's second series featured in the publication, the first being the critically acclaimed A Silent Voice. The series' first arc finished on December 4, 2019, while the second started on January 22, 2020. The first printed volume was released on January 17, 2017 while the latest nineteenth one was released on February 17, 2023.

On January 17, 2017, Kodansha USA announced that they would digitally publish the first ten chapters of the series on various digital platforms. Thereafter, they would publish the manga's new chapters simultaneously with the Japanese releases. The first printed volume in North America was released on October 31, 2017. The seventeenth volume was released on July 26, 2022.

Anime

On January 8, 2020, Kodansha announced that the manga would receive an anime television series adaptation, to air on NHK Educational TV. The series was animated by Brain's Base and directed by Masahiko Murata, with Shinzō Fujita handling series composition, Koji Yabuno designing the characters, and Ryo Kawasaki composing the music. Originally scheduled to premiere in October 2020, the series was delayed until April 2021 due to the COVID-19 pandemic.  The series aired from April 12 to August 30, 2021, and ran for 20 episodes. A second season was announced in the final episode of the first season. Drive replaced Brain's Base in animating the second season, while Kiyoko Sayama replaced Masahiko Murata as the director. The rest of the main staff are returning from the first season. It aired from October 23, 2022, to March 12, 2023, and ran for 20 episodes. A third season was announced in the final episode of the second season. Crunchyroll has licensed the anime for streaming outside of Asia. Medialink has also acquired the series to stream it under its Ani-One brand. Hikaru Utada performed the series' opening theme song "Pink Blood", while Masashi Hamauzu composed "Mediator", which was used for the ending.

Reception

Manga
The first collected volume of the series sold 29,288 copies, ranking 17 on the weekly Oricon manga chart. Its second volume ranked 34, selling 22,565 copies in its first week, while its third debuted at 41 with 20,445 copies sold.

The manga was nominated for the 11th edition of the Manga Taishō awards in 2018 and it managed to gain a total of 47 points. In 2018, Ōima won  the Daruma de la Meilleure Nouvelle Série at the Japan Expo in Paris, France for To Your Eternity. In May 2019, it won the award for Best Shōnen Manga at the 43rd annual Kodansha Manga Awards, alongside The Quintessential Quintuplets. In both 2018 and 2019, Anime News Network listed it as one of the best series for young readers. The first five volumes were listed by the American Library Association as one of the best manga series written for a young audience in 2019.

The manga's narrative and setting have been praised by critics like Otaku USA due to its multiple fantasy and drama elements. However, he felt the story provided in the first volume lacked the emotional impact from the mangaka's previous work, A Silent Voice. Two reviewers from Anime News Network (ANN) and one from UK Anime Network gave the first volume perfect reviews, impressed by the narrative's depth in exploring the multiplicity of characters as well as how the first chapters handled the lonely youth who met Fushi in an Ice Age-like area. Two other writers from ANN wondered whether the new chapters would carry forward the emotional impact of the first. Anime UK News was engaged by the manga's first chapter based on the characterization of the unnamed villager rather than by Fushi. As the manga progressed, Fushi's character arc was the subject of praise as he was closer to acting like a human in contrast to his nearly emotionless introduction. As a result, writers felt the tone of the series was still tragic, thanks to the handling of this character. Manga News furthermore enjoyed the series' time-skips as Fushi's immortality allowed him to blend in with newer, more modern scenarios.

The critical response to the artwork was mostly positive. Anime UK News praised the way Ōima drew the pages, by giving the characters detailed features and the way its settings were presented. Similarly, Manga Mexico writer Tania Ávila praised the artworkespecially in the later chapters of the first volume. Fantasy Mundo noted that the drawings helped to further detail the characters and improve their emotional value. The Fandom Post felt that the artwork "is light on textures and right with detailed backgrounds once the story moves from the snowfields to the forest" and felt that the wildlife was often drawn strangely. UK Anime Network praised the way the backgrounds were detailed and how the author built the characters' emotions.

Anime
The anime adaptation also attracted positive reactions. IGN listed it among the best anime series of Spring 2021, directing readers to its portrayals of Earth's culture but refrained from further explaining  the premise to avoid spoilers. In a Filmmarks survey, To Your Eternity was voted the ninth "Most Anticipated 2021 Spring Anime Ranking". In the website Anime Trendz, the series was often listed as one of the most popular series from 2021. In 2022, the series was awarded Best Drama at the 6th Crunchyroll Anime Awards, and was nominated in the Kids: Animation category at the 50th International Emmy Awards.

Three ANN writers gave the anime's premiere a perfect score, based on the emotional storytelling involving Fushi and the nameless youth, most notably when the latter, initially cheerful and talkative, quickly becomes filled with despair, as he cannot find any other people in the region. Similarly, The Fandom Post gave the series' premiere a perfect score despite having read the manga years before, based on the cast's performances and Utada Hikaru's theme song "Pink Blood" which helped to convey a moving story. James Beckett, from the same site, continued reviewing the anime and while still enjoying the anime, was afraid of it becoming too melodramatic. Comic Book Resources felt the adaptation series was well done and given an appealing soundtrack as the emotional scenes became stronger thanks to the music provided. Critics praised the bonding involving Fushi, March and Parona, noting how heroic they were for each other while providing opportunity for more entertaining scenes. However, March's death in the fifth episode was found to be heartbreaking. Fushi's increasing display of humanity was praised, with the sixth episode giving him enough screentime to become the sole main character. Fushi's fight with Oniguma was also listed as the seventh best anime fight from 2021 by Crunchyroll.

The prison arc, however, was panned by Anime News Network for lacking the appeal of previous arcs as well as the animation being poorly done.

References

External links
  at Weekly Shōnen Magazine 
  at Kodansha USA
  at NHK 
 

2021 anime television series debuts
Anime postponed due to the COVID-19 pandemic
Anime series based on manga
Aniplex
Brain's Base
Crunchyroll anime
Crunchyroll Anime Awards winners
Extraterrestrials in anime and manga
Fantasy anime and manga
Fiction about immortality
Kodansha manga
Medialink
NHK original programming
Shōnen manga
Upcoming anime television series
Winner of Kodansha Manga Award (Shōnen)